One True Loves is an upcoming American romance film directed and produced by Andy Fickman as an adaptation of the 2016 novel of the same name by Taylor Jenkins Reid. It stars Phillipa Soo, Simu Liu and Luke Bracey.

It is scheduled to be released theatrically on April 7, 2023.

Premise
After her husband Jesse disappears in a helicopter crash, Emma moves back to Massachusetts in an effort to mend her life back together. Four years later, Emma runs into her old best friend, Sam, and they become inseparable. Newly engaged, Emma receives an unexpected phone call revealing Jesse is alive. Completely torn, Emma must now choose between a husband and a fiancé.

Cast
 Phillipa Soo as Emma
 Simu Liu as Sam
 Luke Bracey as Jesse
 Tom Everett Scott 
 Michaela Conlin 
 Lauren Tom
 Michael O'Keefe

Production
One True Loves is an adaptation of the 2016 novel of the same name by Taylor Jenkins Reid. The feature film from Highland Film Group was announced on June 2, 2021, with Andy Fickman attached to direct and produce and Phillipa Soo, Simu Liu, and Luke Bracey set to star. In September 2021, the film's distribution rights in the United States were sold to The Avenue and Michaela Conlin joined the cast. In an interview, Liu said producer Sarah Finn, casting director for the Marvel Cinematic Universe, allowed him to choose which lead role he would portray after inviting him to star in his first film after Shang-Chi and the Legend of the Ten Rings. He added,

Filming was originally set to take place in Massachusetts. By August 2021, Highland Film Group was in negotiations with the South Carolina Film Commission to shoot the film in South Carolina instead. However, the studio failed to secure insurance due to the state's low vaccination rates and increasing cases of COVID-19. As a result, the production was moved to North Carolina, where filming began in Wilmington on October 11, 2021. On that day, a scene was shot at 1938 South Live Oak Parkway in which a news crew covers a reunion between a family and a loved one who had been missing. On October 25, 2021, it was reported Lauren Tom, Michael O'Keefe, Tom Everett Scott, Cooper van Grootel, Oona Yaffe, and Phinehas Yoon would also star. At the American Film Market in November 2021, a first look image of the film was released.

Release
One True Loves is scheduled to be released theatrically on April 7, 2023, digital format on April 14, 2023 and video on demand on April 28, 2023.

References

External links
 

2023 romance films
2020s American films
2020s English-language films
American romance films
Films based on American novels
Films based on romance novels
Films directed by Andy Fickman
Films produced by Andy Fickman
Films scored by Nathan Wang
Films set in Massachusetts
Films shot in North Carolina
Upcoming English-language films